Conviction is a British television crime drama that premiered on BBC Three on 7 November 2004. The six-part series stars William Ash, David Warner, Ian Puleston-Davies, Reece Dinsdale, Nicholas Gleaves, Laura Fraser, Jason Watkins and Zoe Henry.

The series was created and was written by Bill Gallagher (previously known for Clocking Off and Out of the Blue), produced by Red Production Company, and directed by Marc Munden (Vanity Fair, Canterbury Tales: The Knight's Tale). The producer was Ann Harrison-Baxter (The Second Coming, The Cops), with Nicola Shindler and Gareth Neame as executive producers for Red Production Company and the BBC respectively.

The storyline was later used as the basis for the movie Blood, starring Paul Bettany, Mark Strong and Brian Cox.

Premise
The series is centred on the Fairburn family, all of whom live in an edgy Lancashire town with a growing tendency towards vigilante justice. All three of the Fairburn siblings are involved with law enforcement: brothers Chrissie (William Ash) and Ray (Nicholas Gleaves) are police officers, while their sister Beth (Zoe Henry) works as a lawyer. Beth, Chrissie and Ray's widowed father Lenny (David Warner) is a retired police officer who berates the political correctness of his children's modern methods: he himself is fighting a losing battle with Alzheimer's disease and struggling to come to terms with the fact that he can no longer be the strong and authoritative head of the family.

Ray and Chrissie work as officers in a five-person Criminal Investigation Department team. The other members are the solitary but insightful Robert (Reece Dinsdale); Lucy (Laura Fraser), the newest recruit, with a need to prove herself; and the volatile family man Joe (Ian Puleston-Davies), an 'old school' officer with a barely contained temper and a tendency to both bully Chrissie and clash with the "by-the-book" Ray.

The murder of a 12-year-old girl adds to existing tensions and pushes an already angry community towards action and revenge. In this atmosphere, the various policemen involved in the murder investigation begin to take increasingly dangerous steps towards concluding the investigation. The situation becomes even more complicated when Beth becomes the defence lawyer for the principal suspect, Jason Buliegh (Jason Watkins). As the distinction between right and wrong becomes fatally blurred, two of the officers take things a step too far.

Background
Conviction was described by the BBC as a drama which "explores the notion that everyone has the ability to kill and what it is that can trigger that reaction in any of us (using) the volatile and dangerous world of the CID as a backdrop to show how a group of very real characters are affected practically, mentally and emotionally by what they have to face on a daily basis. It's also about the resilience and humour of family and friends as they too deal with the psychological fallout." The drama makes multiple uses of flashbacks and fast-forwards, interlinking time and obscuring the line between reality and fantasy.

Executive producer Nicola Shindler recalled "Bill came up with a basic idea about an incident involving two policemen which severely affects their life both at work and at home and, from that, we developed the idea about a family who worked in the police station... I think that Conviction is more of a 'whydunnit' not 'whodunnit' because it looks at people's psyche. It takes apart the idea that there are 'good' and 'evil' people in the world – it shows that things are not as black and white as that."

Gallagher commented: "I wanted to write a police drama that I would like to watch. One that would thrill me and disturb me. One that would shake me up and be about subjects that really matter, not just the stories, but the way that the stories are told. I tried to take the characters to places that they wouldn't want to go, were scared to go and to see what happened. I wanted to try and take a daring and confrontational approach. This wasn't me and Marc (Munden, the director) indulging some arty idea but looking for ways to crank up the tension, to delight in the storytelling and keep the thing moving at a real pace. Sometimes we have to hang on for two or three scenes until it adds up, 'till the pieces slot together. But when we get there, it's more fulfilling than having it handed to us on a plate. This series isn't based on any particular crime or case, but on what I feel is in the air, how we react when awful crimes happen. We live in angry times and I wanted to build Conviction around how people feel, how they react, how they relate and why."

Producer Ann Harrison-Baxter commented: "The majority of crime dramas are very black and white, good versus evil, and the police represent good. But life isn't actually like that – it's very grey in all those areas of morality. Bill has taken a genre and a group of characters that are portrayed in a particular way in British drama, and turns it all on its head... (The characters) are detectives, they work for the police force, but first and foremost they are human beings like you and I and although they are meant to be the upholders of morality and good, they are human and they do have emotions and sometimes those emotions get the better of them."

Cast

 William Ash as D.C. Chrissie Fairburn
 Ian Puleston-Davies as D.C. Joe Payne
 Reece Dinsdale as D.C. Robert Seymour
 Laura Fraser as D.S. Lucy Romanis
 Nicholas Gleaves as D.I. Ray Fairburn
 Zoe Henry as Beth Caffrey
 David Warner as Lenny Fairburn
 Jason Watkins as Jason Bueleigh 
 Angel Coulby as Gemma Ryan

 Linzey Cocker as Miriam Payne
 Sarah Kirkman as Lucy Payne
 Sharon Duce as Sandra Bueleigh
 Jason Done as Sol Draper
 Dominique Jackson as Polly Caffrey
 Georgia May Foote as Angela Fairley
 Jennifer Hennessy as Judy Fairley

Episode list

References

External links

Conviction review at DVD Talk

2004 British television series debuts
2004 British television series endings
2000s British drama television series
BBC television dramas
2000s British crime television series
2000s British television miniseries
Television shows set in Manchester
Television series by Red Production Company
English-language television shows
BBC television miniseries